Dodecasyllable verse is a line of verse with twelve syllables.  12 syllable lines are used in a variety of poetic traditions. 

Jacob of Serugh (c. 451 – 29 November 521), a Miaphysite Bishop of Batnan da-Srugh, also called 'Flute of the Spirit' who composed in the dodecasyllabic verse more than seven-hundred verse homilies, or mêmrê (ܡܐܡܖ̈ܐ), of which only 225 have thus far been edited and published. 

With the so-called "political verse" (i.e. pentadecasyllable verse) it is the main metre of Byzantine poetry. It is also used in Italian and French poetry, and in poetry of the Croats (the most famous example being Marko Marulić). In an Anglo-Saxon and French context, the dodecasyllable is generally called the "alexandrine", after the French equivalent.

See also
 hexasyllable, octosyllable, decasyllable, and hendecasyllable — lines of 6, 8, 10, and 11 syllables, respectively
 hexameter — a line of 6 metrical feet, which is generally 12 syllables

Types of verses